The Japan Meteorological Agency magnitude scale is a seismic magnitude scale set by the Japan Meteorological Agency.

Overview 
In Japan, for shallow (depth < 60 km) earthquakes within 600 km, the Japanese Meteorological Agency calculates a magnitude labeled MJMA, MJMA, or MJ. (These should not be confused with moment magnitudes JMA calculates, which are labeled Mw(JMA) or M(JMA), nor with the Shindo intensity scale.) JMA magnitudes are based (as typical with local scales) on the maximum amplitude of the ground motion; they agree "rather well" with the seismic moment magnitude  in the range of 4.5 to 7.5, but underestimate larger magnitudes.

Notes

Sources 
.
.
.
. Also available here (sections renumbered).

Seismic magnitude scales
Japan Meteorological Agency